Henri Gisquet (14 July 1792 – 23 January 1866) was a French banker and Préfet de Police.

References

1792 births
1866 deaths
People from Meurthe-et-Moselle
Politicians from Grand Est
Members of the 4th Chamber of Deputies of the July Monarchy
Prefects of police of Paris
French bankers
Commandeurs of the Légion d'honneur